Karl Luther may refer to:

 Charles Luther, Karl August "Charles" Luther, (1885–1962), Swedish athlete
 Karl Theodor Robert Luther (1822–1900), German astronomer